"Glamorous" is the second single of Natalia's third studio-album Everything and More. The single is written by Australian singer Jade McRae and fellow Australian Adrian Newman. The single version features En Vogue, with member Rhona Bennett singing the second verse solo, although the album version (first and second release) is only sung by Natalia.

B-side
The single includes the song "Where She Belongs" as a B track. It is the theme song of the successful VTM show Sara (Belgian version of Ugly Betty in the USA).

Charts

2007 singles
Songs written by Adrian Newman (producer)
Songs written by Jade MacRae
Natalia (Belgian singer) songs
2007 songs
Sony BMG singles